Strathgordon is a rural locality in the local government area (LGA) of Derwent Valley in the South-east LGA region of Tasmania. The 2016 census recorded a population of 15 for the state suburb of Southwest, which includes Strathgordon.
It is on the road to the Gordon River dam the most south westerly road in the south west of Tasmania. It is a tourist destination for visitors wishing to visit the Southwest National Park and World Heritage listed wilderness.

It is remote by Tasmanian standards; however, fuel can be purchased at the Lake Pedder Wilderness Lodge which also provides accommodation and meals. The road is maintained by Hydro Tasmania and has views of the South Western Wilderness.

History 
Strathgordon was gazetted as a locality in 1968.
The town was the 'company' town for construction by the Hydro Tasmania of the hydro-electric structures that resulted in damming of Lake Pedder and Lake Gordon. Its post office opened on 16 July 1969.

Geography
The locality is completely surrounded by the much larger locality of Southwest.

Road infrastructure
Route B61 (Gordon River Road) runs through from south-east to south-west.

Climate
Strathgordon has an oceanic climate (Cfb) with mild summers and cool winters with crisp nights. Rainfall is very heavy year round, some of the heaviest in all of Australia. Strathgordon as well as being very wet is also very cloudy for most of the year.

References

Further reading
 Rackham, Sarah.(edited by Woodberry, Joan) (1983) Hydro construction villages. Volume three. Poatina, Gowrie Park, Strathgordon Hobart : Public Relations Dept., Hydro-Electric Commission. 

Towns in Tasmania
Gordon River power development scheme
Localities of Derwent Valley Council